= Kapotex Industries =

Indian Textile company

Kapotex Industries Private Limited
- Company type: Private
- Industry: Textiles
- Founded: 2008
- Headquarters: Mumbai, Maharashtra, India
- Key people: Varun Kapur, Rajeev Kapur
- Products: Natural & Blended Yarns
- Website: www.kapotex.com

Kapotex Industries is a manufacturer of woolen & other blends of carpet yarns used in the production of machine-made and hand-made rugs & broadloom wall-to-wall carpets. Headquartered in Mumbai, Maharashtra, it specializes in manufacturing yarns for Axminster Weaving, Face-to-Face Weaving, Wilton Jacquard Weaving, and Tufting Broadloom Carpets & Rugs including mechanized hand tufted & pass tufted carpets and rugs.

Kapotex is currently trading with over 36 countries. Preceded by four generations of wool textile manufacturers, the current management team is one of the only two associated Wools of New Zealand brand partners listed in the Spinner Category in India.

The Management Team and Directors of the company include Rajeev Kapur, Varun Kapur, and Vadlamannati Subba Rao.
